Marie Maurice Jacques Alfred Sautereau (7 September 1860 – 23 November 1936) was a French croquet player. He competed at the 1900 Summer Olympics in two events. He won a bronze medal in the two ball singles. He also competed in the one ball singles where he did not finish.

References

External links

1860 births
1936 deaths
Olympic croquet players of France
French croquet players
Croquet players at the 1900 Summer Olympics
Olympic bronze medalists for France
Medalists at the 1900 Summer Olympics
Sportspeople from Yvelines